The concept of absent qualia is one of two major Functionalist objections to the existence of qualia, the other being the inverted spectrum hypothesis.  Qualia is a philosophical term used to refer to an individual's subjective experience, that is to say, the way something feels to that individual at that particular moment.

The central tenet of Functionalism is that mental states (emotions, sensations, beliefs, etc.) are only a causal relationship between physical sensations, mental states (neurological states), and behavior.  For example: John touches a hot stove, feels pain, and pulls back his hand.  This is an example of a Functionalist system.  A functionalist would argue that attempting to insert the concept of qualia into this relationship creates an empty quality that has no actual physical relationship to anything.  The "quale" in this example would be John's subjective sensation of his burned hand, how it feels to him at that moment to have a burned hand.  The absent qualia hypothesis attempts to demonstrate why qualia such as this cannot exist. 

Michael Tye characterizes the absent qualia hypothesis as, "the hypothesis that it could be the case that a system that functionally duplicates the mental states of a normal human being has no phenomenal consciousness (no qualia)."  For example, if a machine were created which could exactly duplicate the above scenario, and this machine contained a computer system as complicated as John's neurological system, then it is logically possible that this system would have exactly the same reaction as John but lack consciousness, a prerequisite for subjective experience (qualia).  A functionalist would argue that it must be the case that qualia would not be created in such a scenario, thus demonstrating that qualia cannot exist without conflicting with the fundamental tenets of Functionalism.

See also
Daniel Dennett's article "Quining Qualia" for a more extensive Functionalist argument against qualia.

References

Qualia